Carabus exiguus nivium is a black-coloured subspecies of ground beetle in the subfamily Carabinae that is endemic to Sichuan, China.

References

exiguus nivium
Beetles described in 1933
Beetles of Asia
Endemic fauna of Sichuan